Sobral may refer to:

People
 Sobral (surname)
 José María Sobral (born 1880) argentine scientist
 Marcos Sobral (born 1960), Brazilian botanist whose standard author abbreviation is Sobral

Places
 Sobral Base, a defunct research station in Antarctica
 Sobral, Ceará, a municipality in the State of Ceará, Brazil
 Sobral de Monte Agraço Municipality, Portugal
 Sobral de Monte Agraço (parish), a civil parish in the Portuguese municipality
 Sobral Pichorro e Fuinhas, a civil parish in the municipality of Fornos de Algodres, Portugal

Other uses
 Sobral Fault, a geological formation in South America
 Sobral Formation, a geological formation in Antarctica
 Sobral Unit, a geological formation in Europe

See also 
 Sobrado (disambiguation)
 Sobreira (disambiguation)
 Sobreiro (disambiguation)
 Sobro
 Sobroso